Do you Hear What We Hear? is an album by American cabaret duo Kiki and Herb featuring several songs with a Christmas theme.

Track listing
"Opening Medley: Sleigh Ride / Make Yourself Comfortable / Creep / Dancing Queen / You Have Placed a Chill in My Heart / Oh Happy Day / We Wish You a Merry Christmas" – 10:08
"Frosty the Snowman" – 2:03
"Exit Music (For a Film)" – 4:08
"Whose Child is This? (Medley): What Child is This? / Deep Inside / Crucify" – 6:13
"Fox in the Snow / Holiday" – 6:06
"People Die (Medley): Rudolph the Red-Nosed Reindeer / Smells Like Teen Spirit / Suicide Is Painless / Miss World" – 4:44
"Jazz Improv" – 1:11
"Lilybelle / Blasphemous Rumours" – 3:52
"The Big Time" – 4:52
"Running Up that Hill" – 5:14
"Those Were the Days" – 5:11
"Tonight's the Kind of Night" – 9:28

External links
Album page from official site

2000 albums
Kiki and Herb albums